Kocharyan is an Armenian surname. Notable people with the surname include:

 Artur Kocharyan (born 1974), Armenian footballer
 Bella Kocharyan (born 1954), First lady of Armenia, wife of below
 Robert Kocharyan (born 1954), Armenian politician, second President of Armenia

Armenian-language surnames